not to be confused with Émile Henriot (1889 - 1961), French writer

Émile Henriot  (2 July 1885 – 1 February 1961) was a French chemist notable for being the first to show definitely that potassium and rubidium are naturally radioactive.

He investigated methods to generate extremely high angular velocities, and found that suitably placed air-jets can be used to spin tops at very high speeds - this technique was later used to construct ultracentrifuges.

He was a pioneer in the study of the electron microscope. He also studied birefringence and molecular vibrations.

He obtained his DSc in physics in 1912 the Sorbonne, Paris, under Marie Curie.

References

 
 Biographie Nationale publiée par L’Académie Royale des Sciences, des Lettres et des Beaux-Arts de Belgique, Établissements Émile Bruylant: 1866-1986, vol. 12 (suppl.), col 421-423.
 Acad. Roy. Belg. Ann., 1964, 130, pp. 47–59.
 Acad. Roy. Sci. Bull. Cl. Sci., 1961, 47, p. 680.
 Le Radium, 1908, 5, pp. 41–46

1885 births
1961 deaths
University of Paris alumni
20th-century French chemists
French military personnel of World War I